Joanna Louise Page (born 23 March 1977) is a Welsh actress and presenter. She appeared as Stacey Shipman in the BAFTA-winning television series Gavin & Stacey. She played Dora Spenlow in the 1999 adaptation of David Copperfield, and featured as Just Judy in the 2003 romantic comedy Love Actually. She currently co-presents (with Melanie Sykes) the BBC One consumer series Shop Well for Less. Joanna has expressed in many interviews In the past her love for the smell of lemons. She keeps a bowl of fresh lemons by her bed, replaced weekly, and plans on convincing her oldest child to call her first grandchild, Lemon. She plans to have their future date of birth tattooed under her existing lemon tattoo on her lower back.

Early life
Page was born in Treboeth, Swansea, Wales. She attended Mynyddbach Comprehensive School, where she was head girl. She graduated from the Royal Academy of Dramatic Art (RADA) in 1998.

Career
On graduation from RADA, Page spent ten years in stage-based roles, mainly costume dramas for the Royal National Theatre and Royal Shakespeare Company. This led to appearances in film productions, including From Hell, Mine All Mine, Love Actually and Miss Julie. 

Page came to wider public attention after taking a leading role in the BBC comedy Gavin & Stacey, playing the main part of Stacey Shipman. On 23 November 2007, she turned on the Christmas lights in Barry Island, the town where Gavin & Stacey is partly set and filmed.

Page had a leading role in the 2001 BBC drama production The Cazalets, about a disparate, well-to-do English family during the Second World War. In 2009, Page provided the voice-overs for a series of Kingsmill bread TV and radio advertisements and the Christmas TV advertising campaign for the Carphone Warehouse. In December 2009, she was the cover star of FHM. During Christmas 2009, Page played the role of Cinderella in pantomime in Woking, a role she played a year earlier in Wimbledon. The following year, she played the role of Alice Fitzwarren in Dick Whittington at the Milton Keynes Theatre. 

In 2010, she hosted Sky 1 show My Pet Shame. In October of the same year, she became the new face of Superdrug. 

From May 2011, Page provided the voice of the lead character in the first season of Nick Jr. UK's pre-school animation Poppy Cat, later replaced by Jessica Ransom from BBC's Doc Martin. In 2012, Page played Leanne Powell in the BBC One drama series The Syndicate, Helen Pearson in the Sky Living comedy Gates, and Mrs Peterson in Nativity 2: Danger in the Manger. In November 2013, Page starred as Queen Elizabeth I in "The Day of the Doctor", the 50th Anniversary episode of Doctor Who.

In 2021, Page began presenting BBC One's consumer series Shop Well for Less. At the end of 2021 she began co-hosting the show The Pet Show on ITV with Dermot O'Leary. In 2022, she appeared on the second series of The Masked Dancer as Pig.

Personal life
Page is married to English actor James Thornton. They both appeared in the 1999 TV serial David Copperfield (Page as Dora Spenlow and Thornton as Ham Peggotty). They were introduced a year later by Page's friend Maxine Peake, who was appearing alongside Thornton in the Royal National Theatre's stage adaptation of The Cherry Orchard.

Filmography
Film

Television

Theatre

Radio advertisements

Recognition and awards
Page was nominated for Best Female Comedy Newcomer'' at the 2007 British Comedy Awards.

References

External links
 
 Sunday Morning with Joanna Page (BBC Radio Wales)

1977 births
Living people
Actresses from Swansea
Alumni of RADA
Welsh stage actresses
Welsh film actresses
Welsh television actresses
Royal Shakespeare Company members
20th-century Welsh actresses
21st-century Welsh actresses